Stanisław Skupień (26 April 1907 – 11 July 1983) was a Polish cross-country skier. He competed in the men's 18 kilometre event at the 1932 Winter Olympics.

References

1907 births
1983 deaths
Polish male cross-country skiers
Olympic cross-country skiers of Poland
Cross-country skiers at the 1932 Winter Olympics
Sportspeople from Zakopane
Polish Austro-Hungarians